Wei Dai is a computer engineer known for contributions to cryptography and cryptocurrencies.  He developed the Crypto++ cryptographic library, created the b-money cryptocurrency system, and co-proposed the VMAC message authentication algorithm. The smallest subunit of Ether, the wei, is named after him.

Education and career
Dai graduated from the University of Washington with a degree in computer science and is described as an "intensely private computer engineer". Wei Dai was member of the Cypherpunks, Extropians, and SL4 mailing lists in the 1990s. On SL4 he exchanged with people such as Eliezer Yudkowsky, Robin Hanson, Nick Bostrom, Aubrey de Grey, Anders Sandberg, Eric Drexler, David Pearce, Hal Finney, and others in the nascent "rationalist" community.

Cryptography

Dai has made several contributions to the field of cryptography and has identified critical Cipher Block Chaining (CBC) vulnerabilities affecting SSH2 and the browser exploit against SSL/TLS known as BEAST (Browser Exploit Against SSL/TLS).

Crypto++
In June 2015 Dai stepped away from the Crypto++ project to work on other projects. Crypto++ is now maintained by the Crypto++ community.

VMAC
VMAC is a block cipher-based message authentication code (MAC) algorithm using a universal hash proposed by Ted Krovetz and Wei Dai in April 2007. The algorithm was designed for high performance backed by a formal analysis.

b-money
In 1998, Dai helped to spark interest in cryptocurrencies with the publication of "b-money, an anonymous, distributed electronic cash system".  In the paper, Dai outlines the basic properties of all modern day cryptocurrency systems: "...a scheme for a group of untraceable digital pseudonyms to pay each other with money and to enforce contracts amongst themselves without outside help".

Influence on the development of Bitcoin
Described as "money which is impossible to regulate", Dai's b-money described the core concepts later implemented in Bitcoin and other cryptocurrencies:

 Requires a specified amount of computational work (aka Proof of work).
 The work done is verified by the community who update a collective ledger book.
 The worker is awarded funds for their effort.
 Exchange of funds is accomplished by collective bookkeeping and authenticated with cryptographic hashes.
 Contracts are enforced through the broadcast and signing of transactions with digital signatures (i.e., public key cryptography).

Relationship with Satoshi Nakamoto
Wei Dai and Adam Back were the first two people contacted by Satoshi Nakamoto as he was developing Bitcoin in 2008 and the b-money paper was referenced in the subsequent Bitcoin whitepaper.

In a May 2011 article, noted cryptographer Nick Szabo stated:However, Dai questions b-money's influence on Bitcoin: 

There has been much speculation as to the identity of Satoshi Nakamoto, with suspects including Wei Dai himself, Nick Szabo, and Hal Finney, all of whom have denied the putative identification.

References

External links

Official Website
LessWrong profile
Effective Altruism Forum profile
SourceForge profile
Google Scholar profile

Bitcoin
People associated with cryptocurrency
People associated with Bitcoin